The Prince Christian Sound (Greenlandic: Ikerasassuaq; Danish:Prins Christians Sund) is a waterway in Southern Greenland. 
It separates the mainland from Sammisoq (Christian IV Island) and other islands of the Cape Farewell Archipelago near the southernmost tip of Greenland. The name was given in honour of the prince, later king Christian VIII of Denmark.

Geography
{ "type": "ExternalData", "service": "geoshape", "ids": "Q1337527", "properties": { "fill": "#0050d0"}}

The Prince Christian Sound connects the Labrador Sea with the Irminger Sea. There is only one settlement along this sound, Aappilattoq.

There are often strong tidal currents limiting the formation of ice. It has many offshoots, such as Kangerluk to the north midway through the fjord, Ikeq Fjord in the south, and in the west Ilua Fjord,  Ikerasaq Fjord (Akuliarutsip Imaa), Utoqqarmiut Fjord (Pamialluup Kujatinngua) and the Torsukattak Fjord.

Weather station 
At the entrance to the East to the Strait there is a weather station founded by the US during World War II under the name Bluie East One. The task of the weather station was to ensure that the shipping industry had reliable data on the weather at Cape Farewell, Greenland. On January 7, 1959, when the ship MS Hans Hedtoft hit an iceberg at Cape Farvel, the radio telegraphist at the weather station at Prince Christian Sound was the first to catch the ship's distress signal.

The weather station is today run by the International Civil Aviation Organization ICAO together with Tele Greenland. A long wooden stairway leads from the harbour up to the station with community building, power plant, residential barracks and radio aerial plants.

Tourism
The scenery of Prince Christian Sound attracts summer cruise ships to the area, with some vessels as large as the 86,700 ton Eurodam, or the 137,000 ton Voyager of the Seas Ships must go slowly due to the icebergs.

Climate
Prince Christian Sound has a maritime polar climate (Köppen ET) making borderline with subpolar oceanic climate (Cfc) due low annual temperature swings for its latitude and relatively high temperature in center months. Summer temperatures are way below the tree line requirements, whereas the long winters are comparatively mild for its high latitude. The nearby ice sheet produces cold air which keeps summer temperatures down.

See also
List of fjords of Greenland

References

External links

Natural Wonders of Prince Christian Sound (Travel report)

Straits of Greenland
Kujalleq